Kinetic capillary electrophoresis or KCE is capillary electrophoresis of molecules that interact during electrophoresis.

KCE was introduced and developed by Professor Sergey Krylov and his research group at York University, Toronto, Canada. It serves as a conceptual platform for development of homogeneous chemical affinity methods for studies of molecular interactions (measurements of binding and rate constants) and affinity purification (purification of known molecules and search for unknown molecules). Different KCE methods are designed by varying initial and boundary conditions – the way interacting molecules enter and exit the capillary. Several KCE methods were described: non-equilibrium capillary electrophoresis of the equilibrium mixtures (NECEEM), sweeping capillary electrophoresis (SweepCE), and plug-plug KCE (ppKCE).

External links
 More detailed description and several applications of KCE methods (measuring equilibrium and rate constants of molecular interactions, quantitative affinity analysis of proteins, thermochemistry of protein–ligand interactions, selection of aptamers, determination of temperature inside a capillary) can be found in a PDF presentation: KCE is a conceptual platform for kinetic homogeneous affinity methods.

References

Electrophoresis
Chemical kinetics